The IEEE Annual Symposium on Foundations of Computer Science (FOCS) is an academic conference in the field of theoretical computer science. FOCS is sponsored by the IEEE Computer Society.

As  writes, FOCS and its annual Association for Computing Machinery counterpart STOC (the Symposium on Theory of Computing) are considered the two top conferences in theoretical computer science, considered broadly: they “are forums for some of the best work throughout theory of computing that promote breadth among theory of computing researchers and help to keep the community together.”  includes regular attendance at FOCS and STOC as one of several defining characteristics of theoretical computer scientists.

Awards 

The Knuth Prize for outstanding contributions to theoretical computer science is presented alternately at FOCS and STOC. Works of the highest quality presented at the conference are awarded the Best Paper Award. In addition, the Machtey Award is presented to the best student-authored paper in FOCS.

History 

In 1960–1965, FOCS was known as the Symposium on Switching Circuit Theory and Logical Design, and in 1966–1974 it was known as the Symposium on Switching and Automata Theory. The current name has been used since 1975. Since 1973, the cover page of the conference proceedings has featured an artwork entitled synapse, by Alvy Ray Smith, who has also been the author of three papers in the conference.
The publisher uses the acronym SFCS on their web sites for the conferences in 1975 to 1987.

Location 

FOCS is almost exclusively held in North America, and in particular in the United States, with few exceptions.

See also 

 Conferences in theoretical computer science.
 The list of computer science conferences contains other academic conferences in computer science.

References 

 .
.

.

Notes

External links 

 
 FOCS 2009 web site.
 FOCS 2008 web site.
 FOCS 2007 web site.
 FOCS 2006 web site.
 FOCS 2005 web site.
 FOCS proceedings information in DBLP.
 FOCS Best Student Paper Award (Machtey Award).
 Citation Statistics for FOCS/STOC/SODA, Piotr Indyk and Suresh Venkatasubramanian, July 2007.
 Nelson H. F. Beebe's FOCS bibliography, 23 March 2007.

Theoretical computer science conferences
Recurring events established in 1960
IEEE conferences